Rancho Bernardo High School, or RBHS, is a public high school in the Poway Unified School District of San Diego County, California, United States. Rancho Bernardo High School was opened in 1991 as the district's third high school.

Enrollment 
For the 2019-2020 school year, about 2,300 students attended Rancho Bernardo High School. When divided by class, 609 students were in 9th grade, 580 in 10th, 581 in 11th, and 582 in 12th. The student body is 46.6% White, 22.7% Asian, 16.3% Hispanic or Latino, 2.3% African American, 0.5% Native Hawaiian or Pacific Islander, and 0.1% Native American or Alaska Native.

Controversies

Broomstick incident
In a 1997 incident, three baseball players pleaded guilty to sodomizing a new teammate with a broom handle in the locker room after a game. The school district paid $675,000 to settle the claim and the three players were sentenced to time in juvenile hall. The students stated there was a tradition of hazing in which older team members would threaten to rape incoming freshmen players, or would perform simulated rape.

Underwear incident
In April 2002, one of the school's assistant principals forced female students at a school dance to lift their clothing and expose their underwear, in search of G-strings and thongs. The district said the reason for the check was to "ensure appropriate school dress." Rita Wilson, the assistant principal involved in this incident, was later demoted to a teaching position.

Notable alumni
 Matt Araiza, Former National Football League punter
 Eugene Amano, National Football League offensive lineman
 Hank Blalock, Major League Baseball third baseman
 Tom DeLonge, Guitarist and vocalist for Blink-182 (did not graduate from Rancho Bernardo High School)
 Cole Hamels, Major League Baseball pitcher
 Anurag Kashyap, winner of the 78th Scripps National Spelling Bee
 Gosuke Katoh, Major League Baseball infielder
 Stephanie Kim, singer and dancer in TSZX The Grace
 Caity Lotz, actress, dancer, model, and singer
 Reed McKenna, professional soccer midfielder
 Danny Putnam, Major League Baseball outfielder
 Scott Raynor, former drummer for Blink-182
 Jelynn Rodriguez, actor on the show The Drop
 Trevor Williams, Major League Baseball pitcher
 Aaron Wallace Jr., National Football League linebacker
 Will Yeatman, National Football League Player and Collegiate Lacrosse All American

See also
 Rancho Bernardo, San Diego, California
 Primary and secondary schools in San Diego, California

References

External links
 Rancho Bernardo High School official website

Educational institutions established in 1990
High schools in San Diego
Public high schools in California
1990 establishments in California